Cassatt may refer to:

People
Alexander Cassatt (1839–1906), president of the Pennsylvania Railroad
Edward B. Cassatt (1868–1922), American soldier and breeder of thoroughbred horses, son of Alexander
Edward R. Cassatt (1839–1907), American politician from Iowa
Elsie Foster Cassatt (1875–1931), American sportswoman, daughter of Alexander
Mary Cassatt (1833–1926), American painter, sister of Alexander

Other
Cassatt, South Carolina, unincorporated community, United States
Cassatt Quartet, also known as Cassatt String Quartet
6936 Cassatt (6573P-L), asteroid

Companies
Cassatt & Company, a brokerage and investment banking firm in existence from 1872 to 1940
Cassatt Corporation, software company headed by William T. Coleman III